Heather Jean Robson  (née Redwood, 6 May 1928 – 11 October 2019) was a New Zealand badminton and tennis player.

Early life and family
Born on 6 May 1928 in Auckland, to Effie Redwood (née McLachlan) and John Addis Redwood, Robson was educated at St Cuthbert's College. In 1953 she married Jeffrey Ellis Robson, who also played international badminton for New Zealand. The couple went on to have one child.

Sporting career

Tennis
In tennis Robson won both the New Zealand women's doubles and mixed doubles titles. She competed at Wimbledon twice, in 1954 and 1957. In 1954 she reached the third round of the singles, third round of the doubles (playing with Judy Burke), and third round of the mixed doubles (with her husband Jeff). Three years later she progressed to the second round of the singles, quarter-finals of the doubles (with Ruia Morrison), and fourth round of the mixed doubles (again with husband Jeff).

Badminton
As a badminton player Robson won seven New Zealand singles championships, and also won nine national women's doubles and three mixed doubles titles, playing with her husband. In 1954 she reached the semi-finals of the singles at All England Badminton Championships and won the Irish singles title.

Administration
At various times, Robson served as president of Auckland Tennis, Auckland Badminton, Badminton New Zealand. and Badminton Oceania.

Honours and awards
In 1988 Robson received a meritorious service award from the Badminton World Federation. She was appointed a Member of the New Zealand Order of Merit, for services to racquet sports, in the 2001 New Year Honours. In 2013 the Badminton World Federation presented Robson with its lifetime achievement award.

Death
Robson died in Auckland on 11 October 2019.

References 

1928 births
2019 deaths
New Zealand female badminton players
New Zealand female tennis players
Sportspeople from Auckland
People educated at St Cuthbert's College, Auckland
New Zealand sports executives and administrators
Members of the New Zealand Order of Merit
Tennis players from Auckland
20th-century New Zealand women